The European Packaging and packaging waste directive 94/62/EC (1994) deals with the problems of packaging waste and the currently permitted heavy metal content in packaging. 

The Directive obligates member states to meet targets for the recovery and recycling of packaging waste. The Directive covers all packaging placed on the Community market. Targets are set as a percentage of packaging flowing into the waste stream.

The Directive:

 sets targets for recovery and plastic recycling
 requires the encouragement of the use of recycled packaging materials in the manufacturing of packaging and other products 
 requires packaging to comply with 'essential requirements' which include the minimisation of packaging volume and weight, and the design of packaging to permit its reuse or recovery 
 requires the implementation of measures to prevent packaging waste in addition to preventative measures under the 'essential requirements', which may include measures to encourage the re-use of packaging

In November 2022, the European Commission proposed an EU regulation to replace the directive, along with a communication to clarify the labels biobased, biodegradable, and compostable.

References

External links
 Packaging and packaging waste on the EUR-Lex Summaries of EU Legislation
 Directive 94/62/EC of 20 December 1994 on packaging and packaging waste on EUR-Lex
 Procedure 2022/0396/COD for the 2022 proposed regulation on packaging and packaging waste on EUR-Lex

Packaging
European Union directives
Environmental law in the European Union